FoodCycle is a UK charity (no. 1134423) that combines surplus food, spare kitchen spaces and volunteers to create three-course meals for people at risk of food poverty and social isolation.

FoodCycle operates from London, England, but has operations throughout the United Kingdom (see list of operations below).

History
In September 2008, Canadian Kelvin Cheung founded FoodCycle. He decided to start the organisation after hearing about the US on-campus student service program, Campus Kitchen, where students use on-campus kitchen space and donated food from their cafeterias to prepare nourishing meals for their communities. FoodCycle's pilot hubs were at the Imperial College London and the London School of Economics. In October 2010, the first Community Café was opened at Stroud Green, Haringey, London, called Station House.

Philosophy
FoodCycle's mission is to combine volunteers, surplus food and spare kitchen spaces to create nutritious meals and positive social change in the community.

Awards
In March 2010, named New Charity of the Year for the Charity Times Awards 
In November 2010, received award from the Arthur Guinness Fund 
In January 2011, received the Prime Minister's Big Society Award.

See also
Food waste in the United Kingdom
Campus Kitchen

References

Further reading
 Waste: Uncovering the Global Food Scandal, (W.W. Norton, 2009) by Tristram Stuart

External links
 
 

Charities based in London
2008 establishments in the United Kingdom
Food and the environment
Food security
Organizations established in 2008
Hunger relief organizations